The List of newspapers in Sri Lanka lists every daily and non-daily news publication currently operating in Sri Lanka. The list includes information on whether it is distributed daily or non-daily, and who publishes it. For those newspapers that are also published online, the website is given.

General newspapers

Special interest newspapers/magazines

References

Sri Lanka
 
Newspapers